Zone of Death may refer to
Death zone, in mountaineering, a deadly altitude above 
The Zone of Death, a lost French film from 1917
Zone of Death (Yellowstone), an anomalous legal zone in Yellowstone National Park